These are the partial results of the athletics competition at the 1979 Mediterranean Games taking place between 23 and 28 September 1979 in Split, Yugoslavia.

Men's results

100 meters
Heats – 23 SeptemberWind:Heat 1: +3.6 m/s, Heat 2: +0.5 m/s

Final – 24 SeptemberWind:-0.6 m/s

200 meters
Heats – 25 SeptemberWind:Heat 1: ? m/s, Heat 2: +1.7 m/s

Final – 27 September

Wind: +0.7 m/s

400 meters
Heats – 23 September

Final – 25 September

800 meters
Heats – 23 September

Final – 25 September

1500 meters

5000 meters

10,000 meters
23 September

Marathon
28 SeptemberThe results are unofficial as the distance was 41.3 km, thus shorter than the required 42.195 kilometres.

110 meters hurdles
28 SeptemberWind: -1.2 m/s

400 meters hurdles
24 September

3000 meters steeplechase
27 September

4 × 100 meters relay
28 September

4 × 400 meters relay
28 September

20 kilometers walk
24 September

High jump
28 September

Pole vault
27 September

Long jump
27 September

Triple jump
27 September

Shot put
24 September

Discus throw

Hammer throw
25 September

Javelin throw

Decathlon
24–25 September

Women's results

100 meters
Heats – 24 SeptemberWind:Heat 1: +0.6 m/s, Heat 2: ? m/s

Final – 24 SeptemberWind:-1.0 m/s

200 meters
27 SeptemberWind:+1.2 m/s

400 meters

800 meters
25 September

1500 meters
28 September

100 meters hurdles
Wind: -3.0 m/s

4 × 100 meters relay
28 September

4 × 400 meters relay
28 September

High jump
25 September

Long jump
24 September

Shot put

Discus throw
23 September

Javelin throw

Pentathlon

References

Mediterranean Games
1979